The 2016 United States House of Representatives elections in Indiana were held on November 8, 2016, to elect the nine U.S. representatives from the state of Indiana, one from each of the state's nine congressional districts. The elections coincided with the 2016 U.S. presidential election, as well as other elections to the House of Representatives, elections to the United States Senate and various state and local elections. The primaries were held on May 3.

District 1

The incumbent is Democrat Pete Visclosky, who has represented the district since 1985. He was re-elected with 61% of the vote in 2014.  The district has a PVI of D+10.

Democratic primary
Candidates
 Pete Visclosky, incumbent
 Willie Brown

Primary results

General election

Results

District 2

The incumbent is Republican Jackie Walorski, who has represented the district since 2013. She was re-elected with 59% of the vote in 2014.  The district has a PVI of R+6.  Walorski was considered a potential candidate for the U.S. Senate, but decided to run for re-election instead.

Democrats attempted to recruit State Representative David L. Niezgodski, but he decided to run for re-election instead.

Democratic primary
Candidates
 Douglas Carpenter, 2014 Democratic candidate for Indiana's Second congressional district
 Lynn Coleman, mayoral aide, police officer, former  Division Chief at South Bend Police Department

Primary results

Republican primary
Candidates
 Jeff Petermann
 Jackie Walorski (Incumbent)

Primary results

General election

Results

District 3

The incumbent is Republican Marlin Stutzman, who has represented the district since 2010. He was re-elected with 66% of the vote in 2014.  The district has a PVI of R+13. Stutzman did not run for reelection, instead opting to run in the U.S. Senate election primary to succeed Dan Coats, who retired.

Republican State Senators Jim Banks, and Liz Brown, and former Wisconsin State Senator Pam Galloway, ran to succeed him.  Former Whitley County Councilman Scott Wise, who was the Libertarian nominee for this seat in 2010 and 2014,  ran as a Republican but withdrew in October. 

Democrats Todd Nightenhelser and Tommy Schrader also announced their candidacies.

Democratic primary
Candidates
 Todd Nightenhelser, small business owner
 John Forrest Roberson, veteran, 2015 Democratic Candidate for mayor of Fort Wayne, Indiana, 2012 Democratic candidate for IN-3
 Tommy A. Schrader, perennial candidate

Primary results

Republican primary
Candidates
 Jim Banks, State Senator
 Mark Willard Baringer, 2014 Republican candidate for IN-3
 Liz Brown, State Senator
 Pam Galloway, former Wisconsin State Senator
 Kevin Howell
 Kip Tom, farmer

Primary results

General election

Results

District 4

The incumbent is Republican Todd Rokita, who has represented the district since 2011. He was re-elected with 67% of the vote in 2014.  The district has a PVI of R+11.  Rokita considered running for the open US Senate seat, but decided to run for re-election instead.

Democratic primary
Candidates
 John Dale, farmer, teacher, 2014 Democratic Nominee for IN-04

Primary results

Republican primary
 Kevin J. Grant, accountant, financial advisor, consultant, US Army veteran, National Guard veteran, 2014 Republican Candidate for IN-4
 Todd Rokita, incumbent

Primary results

After Donald Trump selected Mike Pence, the Governor of Indiana, as his running mate, Rokita dropped out of the House election to file as a candidate for Governor. The vacancy on the ballot will need to be filled by precinct chairs in the district by August 14, and Rokita could be reinstalled on the ballot if he is not selected for Governor.

General election

Results

District 5

The incumbent is Republican Susan Brooks, who has represented the district since 2013. She was re-elected with 65% of the vote in 2014.  The district has a PVI of R+9.  Brooks is running for re-election.

Angela Demaree, a veterinarian and Army Reserve officer, is running for the Democratic nomination.

Democratic primary
Candidates
 Allen R. Davidson
 Angela Demaree

Primary results

Republican primary
Candidates
 Susan Brooks (Incumbent)
 Mike Campbell
 Stephen M. MacKenzie

Primary results

After Trump selected Pence as his running mate, Brooks dropped out of the House election to file as a candidate for Governor. The vacancy on the ballot will need to be filled by precinct chairs in the district by August 14, and Brooks could be reinstalled on the ballot if she is not selected for Governor.

General election

Results

District 6

The incumbent is Republican Luke Messer, who has represented the district since 2013. He was re-elected with 66% of the vote in 2014.  The district has a PVI of R+12.

Democratic primary
Candidates
 Danny Basham
 George Thomas Holland
 Bruce W. Peavler
 Ralph Spelbring
 Barry Welsh

Primary results

Republican primary
Candidates
 Charles Chuck Johnson Jr.
 Luke Messer (Incumbent);
 Jeff Smith

Primary results

General election

Results

District 7

The incumbent is Democrat André Carson, who has represented the district since 2008. He was re-elected with 55% of the vote in 2014.  The district has a PVI of D+13.

Wayne Harmon, a parole agent and candidate for this seat in 2012 and 2014, is running for the Republican nomination.

Democratic primary
Candidates
 Andre Carson (Incumbent)
 Curtis D. Godfrey
 Pierre Quincy Pullins

Primary results

Republican primary
Candidates
 Wayne "Gunny" Harmon
 JD Miniear
 Catherine "Cat" Ping

Primary results

General election

Results

District 8

The incumbent is Republican Larry Bucshon, who has represented the district since 2011. He was re-elected with 60% of the vote in 2014.  The district has a PVI of R+8.

Former Democratic State Representatives Ron Drake and David Orentlicher ran in the Democratic primary election.

Democratic primary
Candidates
 Ron Drake, Former Democratic State Representative
 David Orentlicher, Former Democratic State Representative

Primary results

Republican primary
Candidates
 Larry Bucshon (Incumbent)
 Richard Moss

Primary results

General election

Results

District 9

The incumbent is Republican Todd Young, who has represented the district since 2011. He was re-elected with 62% of the vote in 2014. The district has a PVI of R+9. Young did not run for re-election, instead opting to run for the open U.S. Senate seat. 

Republican State Senators Erin Houchin and Brent Waltz, Indiana Attorney General Greg Zoeller, and businessman Trey Hollingsworth faced off in the primary election, with Hollingsworth prevailing. 

Monroe County Council member Shelli Yoder, who was the nominee in 2012, was again the Democratic nominee. In the general election, Hollingsworth defeated Yoder by 14 points, winning 54% of the vote.

Democratic primary
candidates
 Bob Kern
 James R. McClure Jr.
 Bill Thomas
 Shelli Yoder

Primary results

Republican primary
Candidates
 Trey Hollingsworth, Businessman
 Erin Houchin, State Senator
 Brent Waltz, State Senator
 Greg Zoeller, Indiana Attorney General

Primary results

General election

Candidates
Shelli Yoder (Democratic), Monroe County Councilwoman
Trey Hollingsworth (Republican), businessman
Russell Brooksbank (Libertarian), local Teamsters Chief Steward and Libertarian Party Vice Chair in Clark County

Polling

Results

References

External links
U.S. House elections in Indiana, 2016 at Ballotpedia
Campaign contributions at OpenSecrets

House
Indiana
2016